Itame vincularia is a moth in the family Geometridae. It is found in France, Portugal, Spain, North Africa and Turkey.

The wingspan is about 28–32 mm.

The larvae feed on Rhamnus infectoria and Frangula alnus.

Subspecies
Itame vincularia vincularia
Itame vincularia latefasciata Rothschild, 1914
Itame vincularia lycioidaria Herbulot, 1957
Itame vincularia mrassinaria (Oberthur, 1923)

References

External links

Lepiforum.de

Moths described in 1813
Macariini
Moths of Europe
Insects of Turkey
Taxa named by Jacob Hübner